Putna County was a county (Romanian: județ) in the Kingdom of Romania, in southern Moldavia. The county seat was Focșani. 

The county was located in the central-eastern part of Greater Romania, in the south of Moldavia. Today, most of the territory of the former county is part of Vrancea County. The county was bordered on the north by Bacău County, to the east by Tecuci County, to the south by the counties of Râmnicu Sărat and Buzău, and to the west by Trei-Scaune County.

Administrative organization

The capital of Putna County was the town of Focşani. The county had five cities (Focșani, Adjud, Mărășești, Odobești, and Panciu) and 265 villages.

In 1930, Putna County was administratively divided into three districts (plăși):
Plasa Mărășești, with 36 villages
Plasa Trotuș, with 46 villages
Plasa Vrancea, with 48 villages

Subsequently three more districts were established:
Plasa Zăbala, with 59 villages
Plasa Gârlele, with 42 villages
Plasa Biliești, with 34 villages

Judicial organization
Putna County had a court with two sections, fourteen magistrates, one chief prosecutor and two prosecutors in the Galați Court of Appeal and nine judges in Focșani, Adjud, Mărășești, Panciu, Năruja, Sascut, Tulnici, and Vidra, with a total of eighteen magistrates.

Population 
According to the 1930 census data, the county population was 194,105 inhabitants, 93.3% Romanians, 3.5% Jews, 1.2% Romanies, 1.1% Hungarians, as well as other minorities. From the religious point of view, 94.2% were Eastern Orthodox, 3.6% were Jewish, 1.6% were Roman Catholic, as well as other minorities.

Urban population 
In 1930, the county's urban population was 58,683 inhabitants, 84.6% Romanians, 10.9% Jews, 1.5% Hungarians, as well as other minorities. From the religious point of view, the urban population was composed of 85.1%  Eastern Orthodox, 11.1% Jewish, 2.2% Roman Catholic, as well as other minorities.

Religion
The county contained 199 Orthodox churches, a Roman Catholic church, a Roman Catholic chapel, two Armenian churches and twelve synagogues. There were two Orthodox monasteries in Vizantea and Soveja and seven Orthodox hermitages: Valea Neagră, Brazi, Trotușanu, Mușunoaiele, Buluc, and Lepșa. The county had three Orthodox protopopes residing in Focșani, Drăgușeni, and Vrancea and was in the eparchy (bishopric) of Roman (in the metropolitanate of Moldavia and Suceava).

References

External links

  Putna County on memoria.ro

Former counties of Romania
1950 disestablishments in Romania
1859 establishments in Romania
States and territories disestablished in 1950
States and territories established in 1859
1938 disestablishments in Romania
1940 establishments in Romania
States and territories disestablished in 1938
States and territories established in 1940